Mohammadabad-e Olya (also Romanized as Moḩammadābād-e ‘Olyā; also known as Moḩammadābād) is a village in Quchan Atiq Rural District, in the Central District of Quchan County, Razavi Khorasan Province, Iran. At the 2006 census, its population was 157, in 36 families.

References 

Populated places in Quchan County